Ronnie Haliburton (born April 14, 1968) is a former American football tight end. He played for the Denver Broncos from 1990 to 1991.

References

1968 births
Living people
American football tight ends
LSU Tigers football players
Denver Broncos players
Shreveport Pirates players